Carlos Aguirre (born 4 June 1952) is a retired Mexican show jumper who won team medals at the Pan American Games in 1975 and 1979. He placed 19th individually and 8th with the team at the 1976 Summer Olympics.

References

1952 births
Living people
Mexican male equestrians
Olympic equestrians of Mexico
Equestrians at the 1976 Summer Olympics
Pan American Games silver medalists for Mexico
Pan American Games bronze medalists for Mexico
Pan American Games medalists in equestrian
Equestrians at the 1975 Pan American Games
Equestrians at the 1979 Pan American Games
Medalists at the 1975 Pan American Games
Medalists at the 1979 Pan American Games